Lincoln Cemetery is a historically African American cemetery in Blue Island, Illinois, United States.

History
Founded in 1911 by local Black business leaders, the cemetery is next to the Oak Hill Cemetery. The cemetery is noteworthy for the number of famous African-American Chicagoans buried there, among them several notable blues and jazz musicians, as well as notables in literature, sports, and history.

Notable graves

 Robert Sengstacke Abbott (1870–1940), newspaper publisher
 Albert Ammons (1907–1949), jazz/boogie-woogie pianist
 Gene Ammons (1925–1974), jazz tenor saxophonist (son of Albert Ammons)
 Lillian Hardin Armstrong (1898–1971), jazz singer/pianist/second wife of Louis Armstrong (Garden of Peace Mausoleum)
 Charles Avery (1892–1974), blues and boogie-woogie pianist
 Big Bill Broonzy (1893–1958), blues musician
 Gwendolyn Brooks (1917–2000), poet, first African American to win a Pulitzer Prize
 Bessie Coleman (1892–1926), early African-American aviator
 Johnny Dodds (1892–1940), jazz clarinetist
 Warren "Baby" Dodds (1898–1959), jazz drummer
 Charles "Pat" Dougherty (1879–1939) American baseball pitcher in the pre-Negro leagues
 Andrew Rube Foster (1879–1930), American baseball player, manager, and executive in the Negro leagues.  "The father of black baseball."
 William "Bill" Francis (1879–1942) third baseman and manager in the Negro leagues.
 King Daniel Ganaway, photographer (d. 1944)
 Octavius Granady (1872–1928), committeeman in the "Bloody 20th Ward",  killed by the mobster Morris Elder.
 Vivian Harsh (1890–1960), first African American librarian in the Chicago Public Library, created a monumental research collection on black life.
 Al Hibbler (1915–2001), American baritone vocalist.
 Papa Charlie Jackson (1887–1938), American blues singer, songster and banjoist/guitarist
 Tom "College Boy" Johnson (1889–1926) American baseball pitcher in the Negro leagues
 Frank Leland (1869–1914), American baseball player, manager, and executive in the pre-Negro leagues
 Lillian C. Moseley (1905–2007) Bronzeville socialite, worked for notables on both sides of the law: Al Capone, Attorney Roy Washington, The Honorable Harold Washington, first African American Mayor of Chicago and the Honorable Judge Abraham Lincoln Marovitz
 Jimmy Reed (1925–1976), blues musician
 Elder Lucy Smith (1875–1952) first woman to pastor a major Chicago congregation, early radio evangelist.
 Blanche Wilkins Williams (1876–1936), educator of deaf children
 Jesse Ernest Wilkins Sr. (1894–1959) Undersecretary of Labor in the Eisenhower administration.
 Ella (Wilson) Wright (1884–1959) schoolteacher and mother of writer Richard Wright 1908–1960.
 At least 14 victims of the Chicago race riot of 1919, including teenager Eugene Williams.

References

External links
 
 

Blue Island, Illinois
Cemeteries in Cook County, Illinois
1911 establishments in Illinois
African-American cemeteries